Mogh Ahmad or Mugh Ahmad may refer to:
 Mogh Ahmad-e Bala
 Mogh Ahmad-e Pain